Khyber Medical University (abbreviated as KMU), is a public research university located in Peshawar, Khyber Pakhtunkhwa, Pakistan. 

Established in January 2007, the university comprises several constituent colleges and institutes, affiliated undergraduate and postgraduate medical and dental institutes and various allied health sciences programs.

Recognized university
Khyber Medical University is a recognized university by the Higher Education Commission of Pakistan and by the Pakistan Medical and Dental Council.

Constituent institutions
 KMU Institute of Basic Medical Sciences 
 KMU Institute of Dental Sciences, Kohat
 KMU Institute of Health Professions Education and Research
 KMU Institute Of Medical Sciences, Kohat
 KMU Institute of Nursing Sciences, Peshawar
 KMU Institute of Paramedical Sciences, Peshawar
 KMU Institute of Physical Medicine and Rehabilitation, Peshawar
 KMU Institute of Public Health and Social Sciences, Peshawar
 KMU Institute of Health Sciences, Mardan
 KMU Institute of Health Sciences, Swat
 KMU Institute of Health Sciences, Islamabad
 KMU Institute of Paramedical Sciences, Lakki Marwat
 KMU Institute of Health Sciences, Kohat
 KMU Institute of Pharmaceutical Sciences, Peshawar
 KMU Institute of Pathology and Diagnostic Medicine, Peshawar
 KMU Institute of Health Sciences, Lower Dir
 KMU Institute of Health Sciences, Swabi
 KMU Institute of Health Sciences, Kurram

Affiliated institutions

Undergraduate
 Khyber Medical College (Peshawar)
 Ayub College of Dentistry (Abbottabad)
 Ayub Medical College (Abbottabad)
 Bannu Medical College (Bannu)
 Gajju Khan Medical College (Swabi)
 Gomal Medical College (Dera Ismail Khan)
 Jinnah Medical College (Peshawar)
 Khyber College of Dentistry (Peshawar)
 Khyber Girls Medical College (Peshawar)
 Rehman Medical College (Peshawar)
  Northwest School of Medicine, (Peshawar)
 Saidu Medical College, (Swat)
 Women Medical and Dental College, (Abbottabad)
  Al Razi Medical College, (Peshawar)
 Pak International Medical College, Peshawar

Postgraduate
 Post Graduate Medical Institute Peshawar

Nursing
 Ayub School of Nursing (Abbottabad)
 Northwest College of Nursing, Peshawar
 RMI School of Nursing, Peshawar
 Royal College of Nursing, Swat (Saidu Sharif)
 Buner Institute of Health Sciences, Buner

Pharmacy
 Northwest College of Pharmacy, Peshawar

Allied health sciences
 Bannu College of Medical Technology, (Bannu)
 Frontier Homeopathic Medical College, Peshawar
 Mahboob School of Physiotherapy, Peshawar
 National Institute of Health and Management Sciences, Peshawar
 Northwest College of Physical Therapy, Peshawar
 Pakistan Institute of Community Ophthalmology, Peshawar
 Pakistan Institute of Prosthetics & Orthotics Sciences, Peshawar
 RMI School of Allied Health Sciences, Peshawar
 RMI College of Rehabilitation Science, Peshawar
 Sarhad Institute of Health Sciences, Peshawar
 Udhyana Institute of Medical Sciences, Peshawar

See also
 University of Health Sciences, Lahore
 Dow University of Health Sciences

References

External links

http://www.kmu.edu.pk/index.php
http://www.digitallibrary.edu.pk/khyber_med_uni_ho.html

 
Public universities and colleges in Khyber Pakhtunkhwa
Educational institutions established in 2007
2007 establishments in Pakistan
Universities and colleges in Peshawar
Medical colleges in Khyber Pakhtunkhwa